Samson Felix Amarasinghe, OBE, CCS (7 July 1902 - 19??) was a Sri Lankan civil servant.

Graduated from the Ceylon University College in 1922, with a BA degree. Amarasinghe joined the Ceylon Civil Service in 1926 by appointment of the Secretary of State for the Colonies. He served a cadet in the Kalutara Kachcheri and as the office assistant to Government Agent, Eastern Province. Promoted to Class 4 Officer, he served as a Police Magistrate in Dandagamuwa, Negambo, Kandy; office assistant at the Badulla and Kurunagala Kachcheri. In 1935 he was appointed Additional Assistant Government Agent of Colombo before spending time at the Summer School, Oxford. He thereafter served in the Food controllers office and did stints as Assistant Government Agent in Mannar, Vavuniya, Kegalle and Acting Government Agent Sabaragamuwa, Uva, North Central and Central Province. He served as the Land Commissioner from 1948 to 1950, Permanent Secretary, Ministry of Agriculture and Lands from 1950 to 1952, Permanent Secretary, Ministry of Lands from 1952 to 1953, Permanent Secretary, Ministry of Commerce and Trade from 1954 to 1956 and Permanent Secretary to the Treasury from 1956 to 1961.

He was appointed an Officer of the Order of the British Empire (OBE) in the 1949 Birthday Honours. His brother C. W. Amarasinghe, was the Professor of Classics at the University of Sri Lanka and his cousin Hamilton Shirley Amerasinghe succeeded him as Permanent Secretary to the Treasury in 1961.

References

Sinhalese civil servants
1902 births
Ceylonese Officers of the Order of the British Empire
Alumni of the Ceylon University College
Alumni of the University of Oxford
Year of death missing
Permanent secretaries of Sri Lanka
Sri Lankan expatriates in the United Kingdom